
Gmina Pawłowice is a rural gmina (administrative district) in Pszczyna County, Silesian Voivodeship, in southern Poland.

Villages
Gmina Pawłowice contains the villages and settlements of Golasowice, Jarząbkowice, Krzyżowice, Pawłowice, Pielgrzymowice, Pniówek and Warszowice.

Neighbouring gminas
Gmina Pawłowice is bordered by the towns of Jastrzębie-Zdrój and Żory, and by the gminas of Pszczyna, Strumień, Suszec and Zebrzydowice.

Twin towns – sister cities

Gmina Pawłowice is twinned with:
 Perkupa, Hungary
 Teplička nad Váhom, Slovakia
 Verquin, France

References

Pawlowice
Pszczyna County